Tillandsia circinnatioides is a species of flowering plant in the genus Tillandsia. This species is endemic to Mexico.

Cultivars
 Tillandsia 'Comet'
 Tillandsia 'Corinne'
 Tillandsia 'Pink Panther'

References

BSI Cultivar Registry Retrieved 11 October 2009

circinnatioides
Endemic flora of Mexico